Fletcher is a masculine given name, which may refer to:

People 

 Fletcher Benton (1931–2019), American sculptor, painter and kinetic artist
 Fletcher Bowron (1887–1968), long-serving Mayor of Los Angeles, California
 Fletcher Christian (1764–1793), mutineer who seized command of HMS Bounty
 Fletcher Cox (born 1990), American National Football League player
 Fletcher Dragge (born 1966), lead guitar player in the band Pennywise
 Fletcher Hale (1883–1931), U.S. Representative from New Hampshire and lawyer
 Fletcher Hanks (1887–1976), a cartoonist from the Golden Age of Comic Books, creator of Stardust the Super Wizard
 Fletcher Harper (1806–1877), American publisher, founder of Harper's Weekly, Harper's Magazine and Harper's Bazaar
 Fletcher L. Hartsell, Jr. (born 1947), American politician
 Fletcher Henderson (1897–1952), American pianist, bandleader, arranger and composer of big band jazz and swing music
 Fletcher Humphrys (born 1976), Australian actor
 Fletcher Jones (American entrepreneur) (1931–1972), American businessman, computer pioneer and Thoroughbred racehorse owner
 Fletcher Jones (1895–1977), Australian clothing manufacturer and retailer
 Fletcher Knebel (1911–1993), American writer of political fiction
 Fletcher Magee (born 1996), American basketball player
 Fletcher Markle (1921–1991), Canadian actor, screenwriter, television producer and director
 Fletcher Martin (1904–1979), American painter
 Fletcher Pratt (1897–1956), American writer of science fiction, fantasy and history
 Fletcher D. Proctor (1860–1911), American businessman, politician and governor of Vermont
 L. Fletcher Prouty (1917-2001), Chief of Special Operations for the Joint Chiefs of Staff under President John F. Kennedy, U.S. Air Force colonel and foreign policy critic
 Fletcher Sibthorp (born 1967), British painter
 Fletcher Smith (rugby union) (born 1995), New Zealand rugby union player
 Fletcher Smith (American football) (born 1943), American football safety
 Fletcher Steele (1885–1971), American landscape architect
 Fletcher Stockdale (c. 1823–1890), American politician, Governor of Texas, lawyer and railroad official
 Fletcher B. Swank (1875–1950), American politician and a U.S. Representative from Oklahoma
 Fletcher Thompson (1925–2022), American lawyer and politician
 Fletcher Webster (1818–1862), American government official and Union Army colonel, son of Daniel Webster

Fictional characters 

 Fletcher Reade, on the American soap opera Guiding Light played by Jay Hammer
 Fletcher Reede, the main character of the film Liar Liar played by Jim Carrey
 Fletcher Renn, a supporting character of the book series Skulduggery Pleasant by Derek Landy
 Fletcher Tringham, in the anime series Fullmetal Alchemist

Masculine given names
English masculine given names